Filipe Alexandre Dias Anunciação (born 27 May 1979) is a Portuguese former professional footballer who played as a midfielder.

Club career
Anunciação was born in Matosinhos. During his early career he played mostly in the Portuguese second division, and represented C.D. Feirense, F.C. Paços de Ferreira, C.D. Aves, Boavista F.C. and Moreirense FC.

In 2007, Anunciação returned to Paços for a second spell, going on to spend several seasons in the Primeira Liga, mainly as a starter. Towards the end of his career, in the 2012–13 campaign, the 33-year-old still appeared in 17 games – four starts, 464 minutes of action – as the team finished a best-ever third and qualified for the UEFA Champions League; he was also the undisputed team captain when available.

Anunciação retired in November 2014, being immediately appointed his main club's assistant coach. He amassed top-flight totals of 244 matches and six goals, over the course of 13 seasons.

References

External links

1979 births
Living people
Sportspeople from Matosinhos
Portuguese footballers
Association football midfielders
Primeira Liga players
Liga Portugal 2 players
C.D. Feirense players
F.C. Paços de Ferreira players
C.D. Aves players
Boavista F.C. players
Moreirense F.C. players
Portugal youth international footballers
Portugal under-21 international footballers